The flag of Astrakhan Oblast, a federal subject of Russia, was adopted 19 December 2001.  The flag is a crown (representing its status as an oblast) and scimitar (representing its influence from India) charge on a teal blue field.  The ratio of the flag is 2:3.

References

Flag of Astrakhan Oblast
Flags of the federal subjects of Russia
Astrakhan